The 1962 ECAC Hockey Men's Ice Hockey Tournament was the 1st tournament in league history. It was played between March 6 and March 10, 1962. Quarterfinal games were played at home team campus sites, while the 'final four' games were played at the Boston Arena in Boston, Massachusetts. By reaching the championship game both, St. Lawrence and Clarkson received invitations to participate in the 1962 NCAA Men's Ice Hockey Tournament.

Format
The tournament featured three rounds of play, all of which were single-elimination. The top eight teams, based on conference rankings, qualified to participate in the tournament. In the quarterfinals the first seed and eighth seed, the second seed and seventh seed, the third seed and sixth seed and the fourth seed and fifth seed played against one another. In the semifinals, the winner of the first and eighth matchup played the winner of the fourth and fifth matchup while the other two remaining teams played with the winners advancing to the championship game and the losers advancing to the third place game.

Conference standings
Note: GP = Games played; W = Wins; L = Losses; T = Ties; Pct. = Winning percentage; GF = Goals for; GA = Goals against

Bracket

Note: * denotes overtime period(s)

Quarterfinals

(1) Clarkson vs. (8) Providence

(2) Harvard vs. (7) Army

(3) Colby vs. (6) Rensselaer

(4) St. Lawrence vs. (5) Boston College

Semifinals

(1) Clarkson vs. (3) Colby

(2) Harvard vs. (4) St. Lawrence

Third Place

(2) Harvard vs. (3) Colby

Championship

(1) Clarkson vs. (4) St. Lawrence

Tournament awards

All-Tournament Team

First Team
F Tim Taylor (Harvard)
F Hal Pettersen (Clarkson)
F Ron Mason (St. Lawrence)
D Arlie Parker* (St. Lawrence)
D David Johnston (Harvard)
G Frank Stephenson (Colby)
* Most Outstanding Player(s)

Second Team
F Don Young (Colby)
F Gene Kinasewich (Harvard)
F Ron Ryan (Colby)
D Jack Graves (Clarkson)
D Pat Brophy (Clarkson)
G Richie Broadbelt (St. Lawrence)

References

External links
ECAC Hockey
1961–62 ECAC Hockey Standings
1961–62 NCAA Standings

ECAC Hockey Men's Ice Hockey Tournament
ECAC tournament